"Play Date" is a song by American singer-songwriter Melanie Martinez from the deluxe edition of her debut album, Cry Baby (2015). In April 2020, the song gained popularity due to its use in an edit of actor Timothée Chalamet which led to its widespread use on the video-sharing app TikTok, receiving over 1.9 billion views for the month. On May 1, 2020, the song was certified Gold by the Recording Industry Association of America (RIAA) for selling over 500,000 units in the United States. This was followed by Platinum and later 2× Platinum in 2022, for selling over 2,000,000 equivalent units in the United States.

Background
"Play Date" was recorded in New York and according to Martinez, was written "pretty quickly."

Despite being released in 2015, the song became a sleeper hit and gained popularity in April 2020 due to widespread use on the app TikTok. By May 8, the song had gained over 80 million streams on Spotify and 40 million views on YouTube. The song has been featured on multiple prominent Spotify playlists, such as Today's Top Hits, Pop Rising and Teen Beats. Martinez was featured on the cover of both Pop Rising and Teen Beats.

On April 28, 2020, Martinez posted on Instagram, addressing the song's success as the "best birthday present ever". When asked if the song would be released as a single, Martinez said that she was not sure "because it very much lives on the Cry Baby album already."

Composition
"Play Date" is a dark wave and pop song. It features a "catchy chorus" and has been described as a "punchy pop anthem" and "a serious mood." 

The song's lyrics narrate a woman who is involved in a casual relationship through the metaphor of two children on a play date. Throughout the song, the woman denies that she has romantic feelings for her sexual partner until the end when she confesses that she does.

Music video
Martinez revealed on May 8, 2020, that she was planning to record a music video for "Play Date" from her home.

A lyric video for the song was released on May 26, 2020. It debuted with 1.3 million views in the first 24 hours.

Eventually, Melanie scrapped the video to instead work on the video for her single “The Bakery”.

Charts

Certifications

Release history

Notes

References

2015 songs
Dark wave songs
Melanie Martinez songs
Songs written by Melanie Martinez
Songs written by Jennifer Decilveo
Songs about casual sex
Viral videos